Miluska Benavides (born 1986) is a Peruvian writer and translator. She was born in Lima. She has a doctorate in Latin American literature from the University of Colorado Boulder and currently teaches at the Peruvian University of Applied Sciences. She is known for her prose works, among them:
 Naturaleza de la prosa de José María Eguren (essay, Academia Peruana de la Lengua, 2017) 
 La caza espiritual (short stories, Celacanto, 2015). 

In 2012, she also translated Arthur Rimbaud’s poetical work A Season in Hell. Her next book is the novel Hechos.

In 2021, she was named by Granta magazine as one of the best young writers in the Spanish language.

References

Peruvian writers
1986 births
Living people
Peruvian women writers